The Norwegian Women's Volleyball League is a women's volleyball competition which has existed since 1973. It is organized by the Norwegian Volleyball Federation (Norges Volleyballforbund, NVBF).

History
teams participated in the 2021/22 Eliteserien Championship: Tromsø, Call ( Oslo ), Randaberg, KFUM Volda ( Volda ), Förde, NTNUI ( Trondheim ), TIF-Viking ( Bergen ), Oslo Volley, ToppVolley Norge ( Sannes ), Shetten ( Lilleström ). The championship title was won by Tromso, who won the final series by beating up Randaberg 2-0 (3:1, 3:2). 3rd place went to Call from oslo.

List of Champions

Table by club

References

External links
Norwegian Volleyball Federation 
  Norwegian League. women.volleybox.net 

Norway
Volleyball in Norway
Mizunoligaen
Sports leagues established in 1973
1973 establishments in Norway
Professional sports leagues in Norway